The Latin (Callopistria juventina) is a moth of the family Noctuidae. The species is found across the Palearctic realm.

Technical description and variation

E. juventina Cram. (= purpureofasciata Piller, lagopus Esp., pteridis F., formosissimalis Hbn.) (44 d). Forewing olive brown, shaded in parts with black; the veins pale, towards termen rosy and cream coloured; inner and outer lines double, finely black, filled in with rosy and followed by rosy bands, that beyond outer line broad [en] ; both lines commence on costa as white oblique strigae before the subcostal angulation; stigmata olive brown tinged with rosy, their annuli white, more prominent in the reniform, and
forming a sort of hook at lower extremity externally; sometimes a rosy streak on submedian fold beyond the very obscure claviform; subterminal line yellowish white, forming oblique streaks above veins 6 and 7, followed by a pale apical patch, angled inwards above 5 and acutely outwards at 4, thence obscure; a lunulate yellowish white line before termen; the terminal area rosy; fringe chequered, ochreous and dark olive brown; hindwing ochreous suffused with pale fuscous, with broad dark terminal border, an outer line and cell spot; the Japanese form obscura Btlr. (44 d) is duller, all the rosy tints being greatly reduced in extent and brilliancy. Larva green, with whitish or yellowish oblique lunular subdorsal markings, lateral line yellowish white; all the yellowish markings sometimes edged with pink; head reddish.
The wingspan is 34–38 mm.

Biology
The moths flies from June to July depending on the location.

The caterpillars feed on Pteridium aquilinum.

References

External links

The Latin on UKmoths
Fauna Europaea
Lepidoptera of Belgium
Lepiforum.de
Vlindernet.nl 

Caradrinini
Moths of Asia
Moths of Europe
Taxa named by Caspar Stoll